Tomonori is a masculine Japanese given name.

Possible writings
Tomonori can be written using many different combinations of kanji characters. Some examples:

友則, "friend, rule"
友紀, "friend, chronicle"
友憲, "friend, constitution"
友徳, "friend, benevolence"
友範, "friend, pattern"
友典, "friend, law code"
友法, "friend, method"
知則, "know, rule"
知紀, "know, chronicle"
知憲, "know, constitution"
知徳, "know, benevolence"
知範, "know, pattern"
知典, "know, law code"
智則, "intellect, rule"
智紀, "intellect, chronicle"
智憲, "intellect, constitution"
智典, "intellect, law code"
共紀, "together, chronicle"
共憲, "together, constitution"
朋紀, "companion, chronicle"
朋憲, "companion, constitution"
朝紀, "morning/dynasty, chronicle"
朝憲, "morning/dynasty, constitution"
朝徳, "morning/dynasty, benevolence"
朝典, "morning/dynasty, law code"

The name can also be written in hiragana とものり or katakana トモノリ.

Notable people with the name
, Japanese footballer
, Japanese comedian and television presenter
, Japanese poet
, Japanese daimyō
, Japanese animator and character designer
, Japanese baseball player
, Japanese mixed martial artist
, Japanese footballer
, Japanese footballer
, Japanese actor

Fictional characters 
, a character in the anime series Super Doll Licca-chan

Japanese masculine given names